Persiaran APEC is a dual-carriageway avenue in Cyberjaya, Selangor, Malaysia. It connects Putrajaya-Cyberjaya Expressway interchange in the north to Cyberjaya in the south. The avenue was named after the Asia-Pacific Economic Cooperation (APEC) in 1999 in conjunction of the 10th APEC Summit that was in Kuala Lumpur on 17 to 18 November 1998.

Lists of interchanges 

Highways in Malaysia